Kamla Manhar (born 7 November, 1947) is an Indian politician. She is a Member of Parliament, representing Chhattisgarh in the Rajya Sabha, the upper house of India's Parliament, as a member of the Indian National Congress.

References

Rajya Sabha members from Chhattisgarh
Indian National Congress politicians
1947 births
Living people
Women members of the Rajya Sabha